The Secret Panel is Volume 25 in the original The Hardy Boys Mystery Stories published by Grosset & Dunlap.

This book was written for the Stratemeyer Syndicate by Harriet S. Adams in 1946. Between 1959 and 1973 the first 38 volumes of this series were systematically revised as part of a project directed by Harriet Adams, Edward Stratemeyer's daughter. The original version of this book was shortened in 1969 by Priscilla Baker-Carr resulting in two slightly different stories sharing the same title.

Plot summary

Innocently responding to a motorist's request that they shut off a light at his home, the Hardy Boys discover a deep mystery: the man used the name of a man, John Mead, that Chief Collig claims died five years earlier in a car accident, and no known heir. Adding to the mystery, the Mead mansion's doors have neither knobs nor visible keyholes. Only after speaking to a locksmith do they learn that the locks were concealed.

Meanwhile, their father Fenton assigns them to investigate a lead in the kidnapping of a doctor that may lead down the trail to a local boy who fell in with a local thief, a master criminal, who's a relation to the boy. The Hardy boys are to locate a traffic signal that hums like someone singing faintly, and drive ten minutes from it in each direction, then investigate the area for a "secret panel".

Fenton's mystery ends up intertwining with the Mead mansion and the master criminal, who's been carrying out a series of break-ins and thefts without triggering the alarm systems. It turns out that the deceased Mr. Mead was an electronics genius who developed a device that could open any lock and defeat alarm systems, but asked that, upon his death, it be turned over to the FBI. The master criminal had befriended Mr. Mead, found out about the device, and stolen it. The motorist the boys met was, in fact, John Mead's namesake nephew, who was not known to authorities and investigators in Bayport.

References

The Hardy Boys books
1946 American novels
1946 children's books
1969 American novels
1969 children's books
Grosset & Dunlap books